Illya Krupskyi (born 2 October 2004) is a Ukrainian professional footballer who plays as a defender for FC Vorskla Poltava in the Ukrainian Premier League.

Career
Krupskyi is a product of the academies of Vinnytsia and Metalurh Zaporizhzhia. 

In February 2021 he was signed by FC Vorskla Poltava. He made his debut as a second-half substitute against FC Dynamo Kyiv on 1 May 2021.

References

External links
 
 

2004 births
Living people
Footballers from Vinnytsia
Ukrainian footballers
FC Vorskla Poltava players
Ukrainian Premier League players

Association football defenders